Heuchera (  or  ) is a genus of largely evergreen perennial plants in the family Saxifragaceae, all native to North America. Common names include alumroot and coral bells.

Description
Heuchera have palmately lobed leaves on long petioles, and a thick, woody rootstock. The genus was named after Johann Heinrich von Heucher (1677–1746), an 18th-century German physician, and Professor at Wittenberg University. There are approximately 37 species, but the taxonomy of the genus is difficult because the species often intergrade with one another, hybridization is common, and the flowers change markedly in proportion as they develop.

Distribution and habitat
Alumroot species grow in varied habitats, so some species look quite different from one another, and have varying preferences regarding temperature, soil, and other natural factors. H. maxima is found on the Channel Islands of California, where it grows on rocky, windy, saline-washed ocean shores, and H. sanguinea, called coral bells because of its cerise flowers, can be found in the warm, dry canyons of Mexico and adjacent New Mexico and Arizona.  In the Mid-Atlantic region of the United States, the plants grow best in shade.

Several alumroots and their crosses are used as ornamental plants.

Uses
Native American peoples used some Heuchera species medicinally. The Tlingit used H. glabra as an herbal remedy for inflammation of the testicles caused by syphilis. To the Navajo, H. novamexicana was a panacea and a pain reliever. The roots of H. cylindrica had a variety of medicinal uses among the Blackfoot, Flathead, Kutenai, Okanagan, Colville, and Shuswap.

Cultivation
The majority of Heuchera sold for gardens are hybrids of H. americana, such as 'Green Spice'.
The original 'Purple Palace' discovered in a palace in England is believed to be a H. micrantha × H. villosa hybrid, which was then crossed with H. americana. Another group of hybrids are crosses of Heuchera with Tiarella treated under the name × Heucherella. Gardeners and horticulturists have developed a multitude of hybrids between various Heuchera species. There is an extensive array of blossom sizes, shapes, and colors, foliage types, and geographic tolerances. They are valued as foliage plants, producing rosettes of leaves in shades of green, pink and bronze, often variegated or textured; with long thyrses of white, green, pink or red flowers in spring.

The following cultivars have gained the Royal Horticultural Society's Award of Garden Merit:-

 'Blackberry Jam' 

 
 'Can-Can'
 

 'Green Spice' 
 'Lime Marmalade' 
 'Magic Wand'
 'Marmalade' 

 'Obsidian'  
 'Purple Petticoats'

 'Regina' 
 'Sashay' 

 'Walnut' (Fox series)

Selected species
Species include:

 Heuchera abramsii - San Gabriel alumroot
 Heuchera acutifolia 
 Heuchera alba - white alumroot
 Heuchera americana - American alumroot
 Heuchera bracteata - Rocky Mountain alumroot
 Heuchera brevistaminea - Laguna Mountain alumroot
 Heuchera caespitosa - tufted alumroot
 Heuchera caroliniana - Carolina alumroot
 Heuchera chlorantha - green-flowered alumroot
 Heuchera cylindrica - roundleaf alumroot, lava alumroot
 Heuchera eastwoodiae - Senator Mine alumroot
 Heuchera elegans - urnflower alumroot
 Heuchera glabra - alpine alumroot
Heuchera glomerulata - Chiricahua Mountain alumroot
 Heuchera grossulariifolia - gooseberryleaf alumroot
 Heuchera hallii - Front Range alumroot
 Heuchera hirsutissima - shaggy-haired alumroot
 Heuchera inconstans
 Heuchera lakelae 
 Heuchera longiflora - longflower alumroot 
 Heuchera longipetala 
 Heuchera maxima - island alumroot, jill-of-the-rocks
 Heuchera merriamii - Merriam's alumroot
 Heuchera mexicana 
 Heuchera micrantha - crevice alumroot, smallflower alumroot
 Heuchera missouriensis 
 Heuchera novomexicana - New Mexico alumroot, range alumroot
 Heuchera parishii - Mill Creek alumroot
 Heuchera parviflora - littleflower alumroot
 Heuchera parvifolia - littleleaf alumroot, common alumroot
 Heuchera pilosissima - seaside alumroot
 Heuchera puberula 
 Heuchera pubescens - downy alumroot
 Heuchera pulchella - Sandia Mountain alumroot
 Heuchera richardsonii - Richardson's alumroot
 Heuchera rosendahlii 
 Heuchera rubescens - pink alumroot, red alumroot, jack-o'the-rocks
 Heuchera sanguinea - coral bells
 Heuchera soltisii 
 Heuchera villosa - hairy alumroot, maple-leaved alumroot
 Heuchera wellsiae 
 Heuchera woodsiaphila 
 Heuchera wootonii - White Mountain alumroot

Hybrids include:
Heuchera × brizoides

Gallery

References

External links

 
 Jepson Manual: Genus Heuchera

 
Saxifragaceae genera
Flora of North America